The Battle of Ponza (1552) was a naval battle that occurred near the Italian island of Ponza.  The battle was fought between a Franco-Ottoman fleet under Dragut and a Genoese fleet commanded by Andrea Doria.  The Genoese were defeated and lost seven galleys captured.  The battle made it easier for the Ottoman fleet to raid the coasts of Sicily, Sardinia, and Italy for the next three years.

Opposing fleets 
The Ottoman fleet consisted of 100 galleys which had been sent to the Western Mediterranean when Henry II entered into conflict with Charles V in the Italian War of 1551-59. The fleet was accompanied by three French galleys under the French ambassador Gabriel de Luetz d'Aramon, who accompanied the Ottomans from Istanbul in their raids along the coast of Calabria in Southern Italy, capturing the city of Reggio.

The Genoese fleet consisted of 40 galleys under the command of Andrea Doria.  Twenty of the galleys in the Genoese fleet belonged personally to Doria, six to an Antonio Doria and two to the House of Grimaldi of Monaco.

Battle 
The battle between the fleets took place on 5 August 1552 between the islands of Ponza and Terracina on the Italian mainland.  The Ottomans captured seven of the Geonoese galleys which were full of troops.

Aftermath 
After the battle, the Franco-Ottoman fleet entered Majorca on 13 August 1552. The Ottomans resisted pressure from the French to send their fleet further west, perhaps for personal reasons of the commander or due to the continuing war with Persia. The victory gave the Ottomans better facility to attack Sicily, Sardinia, and the coasts of Italy for the next three years.   After the battle, the Ottoman fleet wintered in Chios, where it was joined by the French fleet of Baron de la Garde, ready for major naval operations the following year, including the, later failed, Invasion of Corsica in 1553. 
In  1560 the nephew of Doria, Giovanni Andrea Doria, led another attempt to thwart Dragut at the Battle of Djerba, but was defeated and Dragut continued his raiding of the Northern Mediterranean shores until his death five years later.

See also
 Franco-Ottoman alliance
 List of Ottoman sieges and landings

Notes

Ponza
Ponza
Ponza
Ponza
Suleiman the Magnificent
1552 in the Ottoman Empire
1552 in Italy
Italian War of 1551–1559